The swimming events at the 2015 European Games took place at the Baku Aquatics Centre, Baku from 23 to 27 June 2015. 42 events were contested in long course conditions.

Swimming was not included in the earliest list of sports confirmed for the 2015 Games, as the European swimming authorities at that stage were minded not to take part. However, following negotiations with the organising authorities, a compromise was reached whereby, in 2015, these events were for junior swimmers only - in effect, under 18 for men, under 16 for women.

In effect, therefore, the swimming portion of the 2015 European Games doubled as the 2015 European Junior Swimming Championships.

Programme

A number of non-Olympic distances will be raced, in addition to a full Olympic programme. The 50 metre sprint in backstroke, breaststroke and butterfly will be held for both genders, the 800 metre freestyle for men, the 1500 metre freestyle for women and mixed gender 4 x 100 metre relays, both freestyle and medley.

Timetable

Qualification

Following the European Junior Swimming Championships in July 2014, (Dordrecht, Netherlands), LEN will confirm the quotas per NOC and discipline based on an average ranking by NOC from the last three European Junior Swimming Championships.

Results

Men's events

Women's events

Mixed events

Medal table

References

External links
Results book

 
Sports at the 2015 European Games
European Games
2015
Swimming in Azerbaijan
Swimming